Tazewell or Tazwell B. Tanner (November 6, 1821 – March 21, 1881) was an American lawyer, judge, politician, and newspaper editor.

Tanner was born in Danville, Virginia. He went to McKendree College and was a schoolteacher. In 1846, he moved to Jefferson County, Illinois. In 1849, Tanner moved to California and was involved mining for gold during the California Gold Rush. He returned to Illinois and studied law. Tanner was admitted to the Illinois bar and practiced law in Mount Vernon, Illinois. Tanner was elected clerk of the Illinois Circuit Court for Jefferson County. He was also the editor of The Jeffersonian newspaper in Mount Vernon and was involved with the Democratic Party. Tanner served in the Illinois House of Representatives in 1855 and 1856. He served in the Illinois constitutional convention of 1863.  In 1873, he was elected an Illinois Circuit Court judge. Tanner died in Mount Vernon, Illinois.

Notes

External links

1821 births
1881 deaths
Politicians from Danville, Virginia
People from Mount Vernon, Illinois
People of the California Gold Rush
McKendree University alumni
Editors of Illinois newspapers
Educators from Illinois
Illinois lawyers
Illinois state court judges
Democratic Party members of the Illinois House of Representatives
19th-century American politicians
19th-century American judges
19th-century American lawyers
19th-century American educators